Diana Finda Konomanyi is a Sierra Leonean politician who has served as Minister  of Lands, Country Planning and the Environment (2015 - 2018), Minister of Local Government and Rural Development (2012 -2015) in the erstwhile Government of President Ernest Bai Koroma. Prior to her ministerial appointment 'Iron Lady' (as she is fondly Called), was the Chairperson of the   Kono District Council. (2008 -2012) after wining a landslide victory in a local government bye election in her home town of Kono District. Following the election of the All People's Congress (APC) and President Ernest Bai Koroma in 2007, Diana was appointed  Board Chair of the Sierra Leone National Shipping Company 

An active member of the APC party, Konomanyi  was the Eastern Province chairperson of the All People's Congress (APC) for nearly two decades (2005 - 2022) and a champion of the party's victory in 2007 and 2012 general elections.   

Born and raised in Koidu Town, Kono District, Diana Konomanyi is widely considered one of the most influential female politicians in Sierra Leone. She is a close ally of Sierra Leone's former president Ernest Bai Koroma and Dr. Samura Kamara the APC's presidential candidate for the 2018 general election.

Political career
Diana Konomanyi was born into an APC Family. Her late father Fatoma Decius Konomanyi was a leading figure of the APC in the Eastern province, and was Mayor of the Koidu New Sembehun City Council and the master architect of Kono District, including the famous Konomanyi Park in Koidu town. Arguably, the most popular grassroots female politician in the APC party and across Sierra Leone, Diana Finda Konomanyi took her first steps into active politics in 1996, at a time when many were afraid to openly identify with the APC, following the NPRC Military Coup of 1992 and the intimidation of opposition politicians by the Sierra Leone People’s Party (SLPP) regime that succeeded the NPRC. 

Diana Konomanyi ran for a seat in the Sierra Leone Parliament  in the 2007  general elections as the candidate of the All Peoples Congress (APC), but lost on  a narrow  margin to the incumbent parliamentarian Emmanuel Tommy of the Sierra Leone People's Party (SLPP).Not deterred by her loss, Diana was among the forbearers of the APC, both in the eastern region and across Sierra Leone, and was among the very first to embrace the leadership of former President Ernest Bai Koroma in the early 2000s, in what was then considered a new wave of leadership in the APC. Madam Diana quickly became a pillar of hope and a foot soldier for the APC due to her steadfastness in promoting APC in unfamiliar territories, and her firm belief that an effective opposition is integral to democratic strengthening.

At the time of her emergence in national politics, it was unfashionable to see a woman at the forefront of political leadership, but Madam Konomanyi carried herself, not as a spouse in support of a partner, as was the expected norm, but as a woman who would come to show that she can more than match many of her male counterparts in Politics. She quickly became a role model for young, confident and aspiring women the length and breadth of Sierra Leone; such was her passion and zest for equality in Sierra Leone.

Before entering Politics, Madam Konomanyi was an entrepreneur and philanthropist of some standing. So when she first showed an interest in politics, many would advise that she stayed away, and should continue  with her many successful businesses, which ranged from being a hotelier and restaurateur, to contract services and diamond/gold mining. For Madam Konomanyi however, politics and the podium it would come to present her would be invaluable in propagating her ambition and quest for equality for women in Sierra Leone. Back in 1996, during the days of our political wilderness and near extinction of the APC, Madam Diana Konomanyi, then a business leader and post-war property reconstruction contractor, would make numerous arduous trips from Kono to the North, Northwest, and Western Area, to rally and embolden APC support. It was from these APC party activism that she would come to found the Northern Alliance, which had a strong base in Koakoyima and Sewafe cheifdoms in Kono district.

During the 2007 general elections, when she was popularly considered as a potential running mate to President Ernest Bai Koroma, Madam Diana Konomanyi would show humility, selflessness and foresight, by putting forward a brother and Kono indigene instead.  For Madam Konomanyi, although she'd made huge strides in attaining equality for women in Sierra Leone, the time was not then right for her to be on the ticket, and putting the interest of her party, the APC, and the nation above her own, she actively enabled a team that would come to win the elections and guarantee immense development under President Ernest Bai Koroma and the APC in the following decade. 

Madam Konomanyi is undoubtedly a grassroots politician who is immensely popular. She's the consummate networker and mixer who's equally empathetic in her dealings with the general population, as she is comfortable hob-knobbing it with the elites of society. With the mentorship, admiration and support of the 2007 Presidential Standard Bearer of the APC, Ernest Bai Koroma, Madam Konomanyi would rise on merit to achieve several gender firsts in Sierra Leone politics:

 2005 The first Female Regional Chairperson of the APC
 2011 The First Female District Council Chairperson 
 2012 The First Female Minister of Local Government and Rural Development. A ministry previously thought to have been the exclusive domain of men and at which she's widely credited to have been the most efficient occupier to date.
 2015 The First Female Minister of Lands, Country Planning and the Environment

Personal life
Diana is the first child of her father Fatoma Decius Konomanyi, with several siblings whom she helped raised as the eldest child of her father. She is a mother to one beautiful daughter, Zaianab Daine Ghandour and two beautiful grandchildren. Apart from these, she is a mother to several others, and aunty, a cousin and social counsellor. 

On August 18, 2013 Diana Finda Konomanyi celebrated her wedding to Alie Kabbah, an ethnic Mandingo, and a Sierra Leonean human right activist based in the United States, in a traditional and  Islamic wedding ceremony in Koidu town attended my many senior Sierra Leonean government officials. In her quest for further education, Diana recently completed a Master’s Degree in International Affairs (MIA) from King's College London and also attended the London College of Fashion in Tottenham London.

References

External links
https://www.kcl.ac.uk/ 
https://web.archive.org/web/20140531105524/http://news.sl/drwebsite/exec/view.cgi?archive=1&num=11979&printer=1
https://web.archive.org/web/20160303235654/http://www.cocorioko.net/?p=5536
http://panafricannews.blogspot.com/2007/08/sierra-leone-moves-toward-run-off.html
http://www.globaltimes-sl.org/news2634.html
https://web.archive.org/web/20140531092515/http://www.sierraexpressmedia.com/archives/62666

Living people
All People's Congress politicians
Government ministers of Sierra Leone
21st-century Sierra Leonean women politicians
21st-century Sierra Leonean politicians
People from Koidu
Year of birth missing (living people)